Ramsundar Pilot High School is a High School situated in Biswanath, Sylhet, Bangladesh. It was established in 1909. 

There are three buildings, one playground, one library, one laboratory. The school has over a thousand students. There are three subjects: Science, Arts, and Commerce. For this student there are 30 teachers, one headmaster, two administrators.  There is a technical section. There are three technical departments: Building Maintenance, Electrical, Mechanical.

External links

1909 establishments in India
Schools in Sylhet District